Balizoma is a genus of trilobites from the family Encrinuridae established by David J. Holloway in 1980. It has only been found in rocks of Silurian age. Its type species, B. variolaris (Brongniart, 1822), is currently the only named species of the genus, and is found in England. The neotype of B. variolaris was collected from the Much Wenlock Limestone Formation at Dudley, West Midlands. That specimen was first illustrated in Sir Roderick Impey Murchison's classic book, The Silurian System. B. variolaris was the original "strawberry-headed" trilobite of Dudley, so-named because of its nodular glabellar tubercles, and well known to early trilobite collectors. Additional species were originally assigned to Balizoma, but were subsequently placed in other encrinurine genera.<ref name=EdgecombeChatterton1993

References

External links 
   Balizoma in the Paleobiology Database
   Listing of Balizoma variolaris neotype in Online Collections at University of Birmingham registry.
   Listing in Official Lists and Indexes of Names and Works in Zoology, 1987 (page 307)]
   Listing in Official Lists and Indexes of Names and Works in Zoology, Supplement 1986-2000 (page 131)

Encrinuridae genera
Silurian trilobites of Europe
Silurian animals of Europe
Paleozoic life of the Northwest Territories
Paleozoic life of Yukon